Crnilište is a village in the municipality of Dolneni, North Macedonia.

Demographics
Crnilište appears in 15th century Ottoman defters as a village in the nahiyah of Köprülü. Among its inhabitants, a certain Dimitri Arnaud is recorded as a household head, bearing the attribute Arnaut, a medieval Ottoman rendering for Albanians.

According to the 2021 census, the village had a total of 1,937 inhabitants. Ethnic groups in the village include:

Albanians 1.894
Macedonians 23
Turks 2
Others 18

Notable people
Ezgjan Alioski, footballer

References

Villages in Dolneni Municipality
Albanian communities in North Macedonia